The men's hammer throw event at the 1991 Summer Universiade was held at the Don Valley Stadium in Sheffield on 20 July 1991.

Medalists

Results

Qualification
Qualification distance: 65.00 metres

Final

References

Athletics at the 1991 Summer Universiade
1991